Edwin Keppel Bennett, noms de plume: Francis Bennett, Francis Keppel (26 September 1887 – 13 June 1958), was an English writer, poet, Germanist, and a prominent academic. He served as the president of Gonville and Caius College, Cambridge between 1948 and 1956.

Biography
Bennett was born at Wareham, Dorset, England, the son of Alfred Hockey Bennett, a confectioner, and his wife Emilie, née Keppel. He was educated at Elm House School, Wareham, under A.E. Skewes; and at the Universität Straßburg, Germany (now in France), under Professor Bartholdy. He entered Gonville and Caius College, Cambridge as a student on 1 October 1914, receiving his B.A. in 1919 (Schuldham Plate, Gonville and Caius College's most prestigious undergraduate award, 1921); and M.A. in 1923. As Ramadge Student, 1921–1923, Bennett was the editor of the Caian, a College magazine; during the Lent term of 1922 he delivered a lecture on 'Poetry and Pessimism'. In 1923 he became 'unofficial fellow' of the College and a Cambridge University lecturer in German. Official fellowship of the college was bestowed on him in 1926, together with the position of Tutor (Senior Tutor, 1931). Bennett resigned from the post of Senior Tutor in 1952, during his presidency of the college.

During the First World War Bennett served in an intelligence unit of the British Army in the rank of second lieutenant (1916–1918), mainly in Palestine.

Bennett's first book, Built in Jerusalem’s Wall: A Book in praise of Jerusalem, was published under the pseudonym 'Francis Keppel' in 1920. Bennett was Erich Heller's doctoral guide at Cambridge; he died in 1958 leaving a large part of the residue of his estate to Gonville and Caius College.

Some of Bennett's poems are published in Edward Davison, comp., Cambridge Poets, 1914–1920: An Anthology (Cambridge, W. Heffer & Sons, 1920). In the Michaelmas 1920 edition of the Caian (vol. 29, p. 29) there appears Bennett's poem entitled 'The Stranger':

He is buried in the Parish of the Ascension Burial Ground in Cambridge

External links

References
John Venn, Biographical History of Gonville and Caius  (vols. 5–7).
The Caian: The Magazine of Gonville and Caius College, vol. 24, pp. 245–246; vol. 25, pp. 80, 150–151, 226–227; vol. 29, pp. 7, 29, 77, 183–184; vol. 30, pp. 71, 140, 189; vol. 32, p. 3; vol. 36, p. 40; vol. 37, p. 42; vol. 40, pp. 24, 32, 72.

1887 births
1958 deaths
Alumni of Gonville and Caius College, Cambridge
Fellows of Gonville and Caius College, Cambridge
Germanists
People from Wareham, Dorset
English male poets
20th-century English poets
20th-century English male writers
British Army personnel of World War I
British Army officers